Mary Hegarty is an Irish-American psychologist who is a professor at the University of California, Santa Barbara. Her research considers spatial thinking in complex processes. She is a Fellow of the American Psychological Association and the American Association for the Advancement of Science.

Early life and education 
Hegarty was an undergraduate and graduate student at University College Dublin. After graduating, she stayed in Ireland for three years, working as a research assistant at St Patrick's College, before moving to the United States for her doctoral research. She joined Carnegie Mellon University as a doctoral researcher.

Research and career 
Hegarty was appointed to the faculty at the University of California, Santa Barbara. Her research considers spatial thinking, and how it is involved in complex psychological processes. She has demonstrated that eye fixation data can be used to understand mechanical reasoning (e.g. interpretation of graphics). Eye-fixation data allows Hegarty to follow the processes involved in understanding diagrams and maps. Hegarty is interested in individual differences in navigation, learning the layout of environments, mental rotation and taking perspective. She has investigated why people with great spatial abilities are more successful in STEM-related disciplines.

Awards and honours 
2001 Elected Fellow of the American Psychological Association
2022 Elected Fellow of the American Association for the Advancement of Science

Selected publications

References 

Living people
Carnegie Mellon University alumni
Alumni of University College Dublin
University of California, Santa Barbara faculty
Irish emigrants to the United States
21st-century American psychologists
Fellows of the American Association for the Advancement of Science
Year of birth missing (living people)